Mujeres de nadie (Women of Nobody) is an Argentine telenovela produced by Pol-ka and broadcast by El Trece from May 10, 2007, to November 17, 2008. The show tells the story of a group of nurses and medical doctors.

Cast

First season 
 Agustina Cherri as Laura "Lali" Garreto
 Susú Pecoraro as Ana Ortega
 María Leal as Margarita "Marga" Vega (Amalia Campos)
 Claribel Medina as Lucrecia "Mimí" Montesi
 Luis Luque as Dr. Guillermo Gutiérrez
 Alejandro Awada as Juan Carlos Rossi
 Federico Olivera as Dr. Pablo Medina
 Dalma Milebo as María Teresa "Marita" Linares
 Fabiana García Lago as Giselle
 Campi as José "Pepe" Gatica
 Gonzalo Heredia as Rolando "Rolo" Peréz
 Florencia Otero as Eugenia Gutiérrez
 Lucía Pecrul as Malena Oltegui
 Laura Miller as Julia Almada
 Víctor Hugo Vieyra as Gregorio Almada
 Juan Manuel Tenuta as Atilio "Don Atilio" Montesi
 María Ibarreta as Elsa Oltegui
 Ana María Picchio as Zulema Nilda Garreto
 Daniel Miglioranza as Dr. Pedro Arizmendi
 Florencia Raggi as Dra. Lucía Estrada
 Antonio Ugo as Leopoldo
 Paola Papini as Cecilia
 Alicia Aller as Teresa
 Ezequiel Rodríguez as Octavio
 Mónica Gazpio as Estella
 Fernando Sayago as Marcelo
 Verónica Vieyra as Mercedes Jáuregui
 Norman Briski as Manuel Linares
 Santiago Ramundo as Claudio Mendizábal
 Jean Pierre Noher as Dr. Franco Mendizábal
 Roxana Canne as Lidia
 Julieta Novarro as Brenda
 Fabián Abecasis as Ramón
 Javier Heit as Pedro

Second season 
 Luisa Kuliok as Raquel Vidal
 Laura Novoa as Virginia Longoni
 Lucía Galán as Carmen "Gallega" Muleiro
 Eugenia Tobal as Cecilia Santillán
 Carlos Calvo as Diego Porta
 Juan Palomino as Santiago Gancedo and Nacho Gancedo (Villain)
 Antonio Grimau as Eduardo "Tato" Canedo (Villain)
 Virginia Lago as Nené Fiore Vda. de Longoni (Main villain)
 Ana María Picchio as Zulema Garreto
 María Socas as Dolores de Porta (Villain)
 Federico Amador as Andrés Iglesias
 Campi as José "Pepe" Gatica
 María Dupláa as María Guzmán
 Azul Lombardía as Bárbara 
 Silvana Sosto as Nilda Gallo
 Miguel Habud as Javier Barón (Villain)
 Luciano Cazaux as Inspector Randazzo
 Norberto Díaz as Emilio Kessler (Villain)
 Susana Lanteri as Pocha
 Adrián Yospe as Cristian (Villain)
 Ornella Fazio as Martita
 Jorge Sassi as Felipe Malfati
 Christian Sancho as Miguel Salerno
 Carina Zampini as Fernanda Almirón
 Valeria Lorca as Irene
 Sergio Surraco as Rafael
 Paula Siero as Mónica
 Victoria Vanucci as Isabel
 Lydia Lamaison as Elisa
 Patricia Viggiano as Nora Furkat (Villain)
 Federico Barón as Diego Porta (child)
 Javier Gómez as Juan Pablo
 Mónica Galán as Rosario
 Norberto Gonzalo as Escalada
 Florencia Ortiz as Belén
 Coraje Abalos as Rodrigo Morales
 Lorena Meritano as Julia
 Luis Sabatini as Bordón

Awards and nominations

Awards 
 Premios Clarín Espectáculos 2007
 Best telenovela
 Susú Pecoraro - Best drama actress
 Luis Luque - Best drama actor
 Gonzalo Heredia - Revelation
 Premios Martín Fierro 2007
 Best telenovela
 Best telenovela actor: Luis Luque
 Best telenovela actress: Susú Pecoraro
 Best telenovela theme: Mujer de nadie by Paz Martínez
 Premios Clarín Espectáculos 2008 
 Best drama fiction
 Premios Martín Fierro 2008
 Virginia Lago: Best supporting actress in drama

Nominations 
 Premios Martín Fierro 2007
 Best telenovela actor: Alejandro Awada
 Best telenovela actress: María Leal and Claribel Medina
 Best actor: Juan Manuel Tenuta
 Best actress: Ana María Picchio
 Special participation: Norman Briski
 Premios Clarín 2007
 Best screenplays - Ernesto Korovsky, Marcos Carnevale and Sebastian Parrota 
 Best actress in drama - María Leal
 Premios Martín Fierro 2008
 Best telenovela
 Juan Palomino: Best telenovela actor
 Laura Novoa: Best telenovela actress
 Ana María Picchio: Best actress in drama

References

External links 
 

2007 telenovelas
Argentine telenovelas
Pol-ka telenovelas
2007 Argentine television series debuts
2008 Argentine television series endings
Spanish-language telenovelas